The Jackson Herald is a local newspaper in Jackson County, Georgia, United States. It is published once a week, on Wednesdays, and is owned by MainStreet Newspapers, Inc. Its contents includes local news, sports and events.

History 
The paper began as the Forest News, founded in 1875, published by the Jackson County Publishing Company. It was renamed to the Jackson Herald in 1886.  In 1891 The Jackson Herald was sold to J.J. Holder for $3000; the old ownership had been "somewhat unfriendly" to the Farmers' Alliance, the new ownership was expected to be friendly towards the Alliance.

The Jackson Herald Building, on Lee St. in Jefferson, was built around 1925.  It is listed on the National Register of Historic Places as a contributing building in the Jefferson Historic District.

Mr. and Mrs. John N. Holder, were given the Herald by Holder's father, the owner of Holder Plantation near to Jefferson, the county seat, as a wedding present.  The couple ran the paper together for many years; Mrs. Holder wrote the social column. Holder "was Speaker of the Georgia House of Representatives twice and for many years chairman of the State Highway Board. Holder was also editor and publisher of The Jackson Herald for almost seventy years." He was a five-time candidate for Governor of the state.

Recently

In 2019 The Jackson Herald is one of several newspapers owned by MainStreet Newspapers, Inc., which is a family owned newspaper company in Northeast Georgia.

The newspaper was purchased by Herman Buffington in 1965. Mr. Buffington served as the newspaper's publisher while his wife, Helen Buffington, was the editor. They were the entire staff; they performed all of the tasks of delivering a newspaper.  The Buffington's were in the business for years and famous for using the newspaper as a tool to eradicate the prevalent corruption and organized crime in Jefferson County.

The first edition was printed on July 21, 1965, containing only ten pages. In later years, the newspaper's circulation trended upward.

In 1968, Mr. Buffington inaugurated The Banks County News in Homer County, and in 1987, he purchased the Commerce News.  He then proceeded to purchase The Madison County Journal in 1997. Mr. Buffington then merged all the newspapers under the name MainStreet Newspapers, Inc.

On 1 January 2017, the Commerce News was assimilated into the Jackson Herald to create a single paper.

Herman Abner Buffington 
Herman Abner Buffington ( May 7, 1926 – July 13, 2014) was a popular newspaper reporter in Georgia and a highly decorated World War II Combat Veteran. He was born in the town of Rome, Floyd County, Georgia to the late Abner Curenius and Essie Green Buffington.

Before entering the newspaper business, Mr. Buffington already had already created a legacy in the United States WWII Army. He first joined the US Army in August 1944 and was stationed in the 96th Infantry Division, which primarily focused on the Pacific Theater. His service to this country earned him numerous awards including the Bronze Star, the Purple Heart, the Asiatic-Pacific Theater Ribbon, the Philippine Independence Ribbon, the Good Conduct Medal, the Victory Ribbon and three overseas service bars.

After returning to the United States, he met Helen Toles and they soon got married 1949. Mr. Buffington used the GI Bill as an opportunity to enroll in the Carrol Lynn School of Business and the Rome branch of the University of Georgia. After his graduation, he worked for Vic's Goodyear Tire, Bradshaw Tire Company, the Celanese Cooperation and Peppered Mfg Company.

His first real Job in Journalism was with the Summerville News in Northwest Georgia, where he worked alongside his wife as an advertising and circulation director. Subsequently, after working for The Summerville News, he launched MainStreetNewspapers Inc. and served as the director of the Georgia Press association (1982–1985).

Due to his deteriorating health, he was later forced to retire from the newspaper business. Mr. Buffington still retained his presidential position even though his sons took over the daily operations of the company.

Coverage 
The Jackson Herald covers Jackson County. Which includes the towns of Jefferson, Commerce, Pendergrass, Nicholson, Maysville, Arcade and Talmo in Georgia. The Newspaper currently has a circulation estimate of 7,446 copies. It is published once a week, on Wednesday.

Circulation by Zip Code

Awards

See also 

Jefferson County, Georgia
List of newspapers in Georgia
List of newspapers in the United States

References

External links 
JacksonHeraldTODAY
Georgia Historic Newspapers - Jackson Herald. (Jefferson, Jackson County, Ga.) 1881-current

Newspapers published in Georgia (U.S. state)
Weekly newspapers published in the United States